Edwin Markham Elementary School may refer to one of several schools named after Edwin Markham, including schools in: 

Hayward Unified School District, California 
 Mt. Lebanon School District, Pennsylvania
 Pasco School District (Washington) 
 Vacaville, California